Conus clarus, common name the glossy cone, is a species of sea snail, a marine gastropod mollusk in the family Conidae, the cone snails and their allies.

Like all species within the genus Conus, these snails are predatory and venomous. They are capable of "stinging" humans, therefore live ones should be handled carefully or not at all.

Description
The size of the shell varies between 22 mm and 54 mm. The shell is abbreviately turbinate and sulcate towards the base. Its color is rosy white. The spire is depressed-conical, striate. The angle of the body whorl is carinated. The aperture is light rosaceous.

Distribution
This marine species occurs from Southeast Africa to Australia (South Australia, Tasmania, Victoria and Western Australia).

References

 Smith, E. A. 1881. Descriptions of two new species of shells. Annals and Magazine of Natural History, series 5, 8:441–442
  Gatliff, J.H. 1891. Description of a new Victorian cone. Victorian Naturalist 7(11–12): 179 
 Wilson, B. 1994. Australian Marine Shells. Prosobranch Gastropods. Kallaroo, WA : Odyssey Publishing Vol. 2 370 pp.
 Röckel, D., Korn, W. & Kohn, A.J. 1995. Manual of the Living Conidae. Volume 1: Indo-Pacific Region. Wiesbaden : Hemmen 517 pp.
 Puillandre N., Duda T.F., Meyer C., Olivera B.M. & Bouchet P. (2015). One, four or 100 genera? A new classification of the cone snails. Journal of Molluscan Studies. 81: 1–23

External links
 The Conus Biodiversity website
 Cone Shells – Knights of the Sea
 

clarus
Gastropods described in 1881